Pamela Casale-Telford (née Casale; born December 20, 1963) is a former professional tennis player from the United States.

The right-hander reached her highest career ranking on October 15, 1984, when she became number fourteen in the world. Her best Grand Slam result was the fourth round at the 1986 French Open at Roland Garros.

External links
 
 

1963 births
Living people
American female tennis players
Sportspeople from Camden, New Jersey
Tennis people from New Jersey
21st-century American women